Elections to Harrogate Borough Council were held on 22 May 2014. A third of the council was up for election, with voting only in the urban wards of Harrogate, Knaresborough and Ripon. The elections were held on the same day as the British local elections and the European Parliament elections. Each ward up for election returned a councillor for a four-year term of office.

Electoral system
All locally-registered electors (British, Irish, Commonwealth and European Union citizens) who were aged 18 or over on Thursday 2 May 2013 were entitled to vote in the local elections. Those who were temporarily away from their ordinary address (for example, away working, on holiday, in student accommodation or in hospital) were also entitled to vote in the local elections, although those who had moved abroad and registered as overseas electors cannot vote in the local elections. It is possible to register to vote at more than one address (such as a university student who had a term-time address and lives at home during holidays) at the discretion of the local Electoral Register Office, but it remains an offence to vote more than once in the same local government election.

Campaign
The elections saw new parties contest Harrogate for the first time, such as the TUSC and a number of Independents. The Conservatives and Labour fielded a full slate of the 19 candidates, UK Independence Party fielding 17, 16 Liberal Democrats, the Green Party 8, 3 Independents and 1 Trade Unionist and Socialist Coalition candidate.

Results

|}

By electoral division
A total of 19 wards in Harrogate Borough Council were up for election in Harrogate, Ripon and Knaresborough. The last election was held in the 2010 local elections.

Bilton

Granby

Harlow Moor

High Harrogate

Hookstone

Knaresborough East

Knaresborough King James

Knaresborough Scriven Park

Low Harrogate

New Park

Pannal

Ripon Minster

Ripon Moorside

Ripon Spa

Rossett

Saltergate

Starbeck

Stray

Woodfield

References

2014
2014 English local elections
2010s in North Yorkshire